Strangers (Japanese title Ijintachi to no natsu 異人たちとの夏 Summer of the Strange People) is a novel by Taichi Yamada, published in 1987. The English translation by Wayne Lammers was published in 2003.

The Japanese original won the 1987 Yamamoto Shūgorō Prize for best human-interest novel. The English translation was one of sixteen works long-listed for the 2006 Foreign Fiction prize awarded by The Independent.

Ijintachi to no natsu has also been translated into German as Sommer mit Fremden, French as Présences d'un été and Swedish as Främlingar (2009). 

A film based on the novel and directed by Obayashi Nobuhiko was released in 1988.

Plot
The narrator Hideo Harada, a 47-year-old TV scriptwriter, meets a couple who bear an eerie resemblance to his dead parents, and forms a friendship with them, visiting them often. As his health declines, he comes to realise that they are ghosts who are sapping his life-force.

External links
 Strangers - Yamada Taichi
 Ijin-tachi to no natsu IMDb entry for the 1988 Japanese film version
  
 Review: Strangers by Taichi Yamada 
 The Independent

Novels by Taichi Yamada
1987 Japanese novels
Japanese novels adapted into films